"Sat in Your Lap" (1981) is a song by English art rock musician Kate Bush. It was the first single to be released from her fourth studio album, The Dreaming (1982), though it was issued 15 months prior to the album, which was nowhere near completion at that time. The single peaked at no. 11 on the UK Singles Chart.

Music
Musically, the single was faster and more percussive than Bush's previous releases. It features Preston Heyman on drums recorded in the stone room at the Townhouse Studio 2, London, and Paddy Bush and Preston on whip-like percussion (actually played on bamboo canes swooshing through the air rhythmically). Critic Simon Reynolds called it "an avant-pop stampede of pounding percussion and deranged shrieks, a sister-song to Public Image Ltd's 'Flowers of Romance'." The lyrics of the song deal with feelings of existential frustration and the quest for knowledge. In his biography on Kate Bush, Graeme Thomson states that the title of the song suggests the possibility of experiencing enlightenment through sex.

Release
Kate Bush stated in an early interview that the single version was remixed slightly for inclusion on The Dreaming. The vocals were raised higher and the backing track altered to fit in better with the overall feel of the album.

The demo version of "Sat in Your Lap" contains an extra verse at the start, which was later cut out of the song. As with subsequent singles from the album, a 12-inch vinyl single was planned but was eventually withdrawn.

The B-side to the single was a cover version (Bush's first) of "Lord of the Reedy River" by Donovan from his 1971 album HMS Donovan.

Personnel
Kate Bush – lead and backing vocals; piano; Fairlight CMI
Paddy Bush – bamboo sticks; backing vocals
Preston Heyman – drums; bamboo sticks
Jimmy Bain – bass guitar
Geoff Downes – CMI trumpet section
Stewart Arnold – backing vocals
Ian Bairnson – backing vocals
Gary Hurst – backing vocals

Charts

References

External links
 

1981 singles
Kate Bush songs
Songs written by Kate Bush
1981 songs
EMI Records singles